The keping was the currency of Kelantan until 1909 when it was replaced by the Straits dollar. It was subdivided into 10 pitis. Coins were struck in tin in denominations of 1 pitis (holed), 1 and 10 keping.

One piti coins were made from tin, round in shape, smooth edged and holed. The coins were 18 mm in diameter with Arabic legend.

See also

 Trengganu keping

References

Obsolete currencies in Malaysian history
History of Kelantan
British Malaya
Modern obsolete currencies
1909 disestablishments in Asia
1900s disestablishments in Southeast Asia